Bürger or Buerger is a surname. Notable people with the name include:

 Gottfried August Bürger, German poet
 Heinrich Bürger, German physicist and biologist
 Heinrich Otto Wilhelm Bürger, German zoologist
 Karl-Heinz Bürger, German SS-Oberführer
 Roland Bürger or Bürgermeista (born 197?), German guitarist and songwriter
 Rudolf Bürger, Romanian footballer
 Martin Julian Buerger (1903-1986), American scientist
 Leo Buerger
 Joseph Buerger
 Victor Buerger

See also 
 Burger (surname)
 
 Burgers (surname)
 Birger, given name and surname
 Berger, surname

German-language surnames